Victory Plaza is a twin tower skyscraper complex in the Tianhe District of Guangzhou, Guangdong, China. Construction of Victory Plaza was completed in 2007.

Tenants
All Nippon Airways operates its Guangzhou Office in Tower A. It was previously located in CITIC Plaza.

See also

 List of tallest buildings in Guangzhou

References

External links

Office buildings completed in 2007
Skyscraper office buildings in Guangzhou
Tianhe District
Twin towers